Elk Springs is an unincorporated community in Moffat County, Colorado, United States.  The U.S. Post Office at Dinosaur (ZIP Code 81633) now serves Elk Springs postal addresses.

Geography
Elk Springs is located at  (40.355440,-108.448277).

References

Unincorporated communities in Moffat County, Colorado
Unincorporated communities in Colorado